Caro Cult (born 27 June 1994) is a German actress. She gained popularity in 2020 by starring in the Netflix series Biohackers.

Life and career
Caro Cult grew up near Hanover. She attended a school in Isernhagen until, at the age of fourteen, she moved with her parents to Bad Nenndorf, where she went to high school and took drama classes. In 2012, she moved to Berlin to pursue an artistic career. She shot several music videos and short films, and later worked extensively with photographer . She appeared on the cover of his book Berlin Bohème, which brought her attention from the international art scene.

In 2020, she landed a major role in the Netflix series Biohackers.

Personal life
Cult is vegan and a member of PETA.

Filmography

Film

Television

References

External links
 

1994 births
German film actresses
Living people
German television actresses